Under the Stars of Capri is a 1953 West German romantic comedy film directed by Otto Linnekogel and starring Hanna Rucker, Helmuth Schneider and Hans Leibelt. It was shot at the Göttingen Studios and on location at a variety of places including Capri, Ischia, Corsica and Hamburg. The film's sets were designed by the art directors Walter Haag and Hans Kutzner.

Cast
 Hanna Rucker as Christa
 Helmuth Schneider as Vincenz Rainalter
 Hans Leibelt as Kapitän Hagedorn
 Wera Frydtberg as Nina
 Karin Andersen as Uschi
 Eva Pflug as Waltraut
 Margarete Slezak as Singer
 Charlotte Agotz as Henriette
 Gerd Andree
 Siegfried Breuer as Reeder Bramfeld
 Hans Friedrich as Hans Holthusen
 Karl Hackenberg as Peter Bolz
 Trude Hesterberg
 Thessy Kuhls as Erste Bewerberin
 Anni Marle as Lotti Bolz
 Dr. Prasch as Erster Vorsitzender
 Lotte Rausch as Frau Erkens
 Rudi Schuricke as Singer
 Max Walter Sieg as Redakteur
 Werner Stock as Czerny
 Michel ter Wee as Francisco fabri
 Tilo von Berlepsch as Claus
 Carl Voscherau as Knorr
 Sonja Wilken as Lisa
 Herta Worell as Bell

References

Bibliography
 Gerald Grote. Der Kommissar: eine Serie und ihre Folgen. Schwarzkopf und Schwarzkopf, 2003.

External links 
 

1953 films
1953 romantic comedy films
German romantic comedy films
West German films
1950s German-language films
Sailing films
Cross-dressing in film
German black-and-white films
1950s German films
Films shot at Göttingen Studios